Allika may refer to several places in Estonia:

Places
Allika, Kernu Parish, village in Kernu Parish, Harju County
Allika, Kuusalu Parish, village in Kuusalu Parish, Harju County
Allika, Hiiu County, village in Käina Parish, Hiiu County
Allika, Lääne County, village in Ridala Parish, Lääne County
Allika, Lääne-Viru County, village in Vinni Parish, Lääne-Viru County
Allika, Pärnu County, village in Varbla Parish, Pärnu County

People
Marno Allika (born 1982), Estonian fencer

See also
Alliku (disambiguation)